Judd is a name.  Notable people with the name include.

Surname

Academics 
 Charles Hubbard Judd (1873–1946), America educational psychologist
 John Wesley Judd (1840–1916), British geologist
 Kenneth Judd (born 1953), American computational economist
 Walter Stephen Judd (born 1951), American botanist and taxonomist

Athletes 
 Chris Judd (born 1983), Australian rules footballer
 Oscar Judd (1908–1995), Canadian baseball player
 Sid Judd (1928–1959), Welsh rugby union player
 Walter Judd (footballer) (1926–1964), English footballer

In film and television 
 Ashley Judd (born 1968), American actress, daughter of Naomi Judd 
 Phil Judd (sound engineer) (born 1948), worked on many films in Australia and US
 Lesley Judd (born 1946), British television presenter

In music 
 Cledus T. Judd, stage name of American country music singer and entertainer born Barry Poole (born 1964)
 Harry Judd (born 1985), drummer in pop band McFly
 James Judd (born 1949), British conductor
 Naomi Judd (1946-2022), American country singer and one-half of The Judds
 Phil Judd (born 1953), founding member of New Zealand band Split Enz
 Terence Judd (1957–1979), English pianist
 Wynonna Judd (born 1964), American country singer; daughter of Naomi and the other half of The Judds

Politicians 

 Catherine Judd, former President of the ACT New Zealand political party
 Frank Judd, Baron Judd (1935–2021), Labour Party politician and Cabinet minister in the United Kingdom
 Lawrence M. Judd (1887–1968), seventh Territorial Governor of Hawaii
 Norman B. Judd (1815–1878), American politician and envoy/ambassador to Prussia
 Stoddard Judd (1797–1873), American physician and politician
 Truman H. Judd (1817–1884), American politician
 Walter Judd (politician) (1898–1994), American politician and physician

In religion 
 The Reverend Bernard Judd (1918–1999), Anglican minister in Sydney, Australia
 Gerrit P. Judd (1803–1873), American missionary to Hawaii

Criminals 
 Keith Judd (born 1958), American perennial candidate for political office and convicted criminal
 Winnie Ruth Judd (1905–1998), the Arizona Trunk Murderess

Other 
 Alan Judd (born 1946), English writer
 Alice Louise Judd Simpich (1918–2006), American sculptor
 Bettina Judd, American poet and artist
 Donald Judd (1928–1994), American minimalist artist
 Ernie Judd (1883–1959), Australian bookseller m socialist
 John Judd (born 1942), British automotive engineer
 Sylvester Judd (1813–1853), novelist

Given name 

 Judd Apatow (born 1967), American producer, writer, director, actor and comedian
 Judd Blackwater (born 1987), Canadian professional ice hockey player
 Judd Ehrlich (born 1971), American documentary film director and producer
 Judd Garrett (born 1967), American  former football running back
 Judd Greenstein (born 1979), American composer 
 Judd Alan Gregg (born 1947), American politician and lawyer
 Judd Hamilton, American singer and musician
 Judd Henkes (born 2001), American snowboarder
 Judd Hirsch (born 1935), American actor
 Judd Holdren (1915–1974), American film actor
 Judd Lalich (born 1975), Australian former rules footballer
 Judd Lander (born 1948), English harmonicist
 Judd Legum (born 1978), American journalist
 Judd Lynn (born 1961), American television writer
 Judd Marmor (1910–2003), American psychoanalyst and psychiatrist
 Judd Nelson (born 1959), American actor, screenwriter and producer
 Judd Rose (1955–2000), American television journalist
 Judd Sirott (born 1969), American sportscaster
 Judd L. Teller (1912–1972), American author and historian
 Judd Trichter, American writer and former actor
 Judd Trump (born 1989), English snooker player
 Judd Tully, American art critic
 Judd Winick (born 1970), American cartoonist and writer
 Judd Woldin (1925–2011), American composer